Street Faërie is the first full-length album recorded by Cree Summer. It was released in 1999 on the Work Group, a now-defunct imprint of Sony Music. The lyrics feature themes of racism, romantic liaisons, and spirituality into the lyrics of guitar-heavy pop and folk songs. "Miss Moon" is an ode to lovemaking while a woman is menstruating. "Fall," a fully orchestral jazz ballad, reads like the breakup of a relationship but is in fact the literal interpretation of the wilting and decay of a leaf: "Black stemmed, orange trimmed/with the slighest wind I'm fallen from you." "Naheo" is a tribute to Summer's Native American roots, while "Curious White Boy" is a Black woman's response to her white lover after she realizes he has become involved with her out of some sense of racial guilt: "Another housekeeper fantasy?/Coffee-colored remedy for your hangover from history."

Track listing
"Revelation Sunshine" (Greg Bell, C.S. Francks) – 4:55
"Miss Moon" (Francks, Lenny Kravitz) – 4:30
"Still Heart" (Francks, Kravitz, Torrel Ruffin)  – 2:51
"Deliciously Down" (Francks, Van Hunt) – 4:51
"Mean Sleep" (Francks, Hunt)  – 4:35
"Life Goes On" (Bell, Francks) – 3:29
"Fall" (Francks, Ruffin) – 5:55
"Angry Boy" (Francks, Ruffin) – 4:56
"Sweet Pain" (Francks, Hunt) – 4:22
"Smooth My Heart"  (Francks, D.R. Harris) – 5:30
"Naheo" (Francks, Ruffin) – 4:06
"Soul Sister" (Bell, Francks) – 4:16
"Curious White Boy" (Francks, Ruffin) – 4:54
"Revelation Club Sunshine" (Greg Bell, C.S. Franks) (* Japanese Bonus Track)

Personnel
Kimberly Evans - background vocals
Lenny Kravitz - bass, guitar, percussion, arranger, drums, harpsichord, organ, programming, tambourine, vocals, background vocals, clavinet, producer, mellotron, cowbell, horn arrangements, mixing, finger cymbals, drum loop, cabasa
Terry Manning -  engineer, mixing
Matt Knobel - Drum programming, digital engineering
Craig Ross - acoustic guitar, mandolin, electric guitar
Cree Summer - vocals, background vocals
Harold Todd - flute, saxophone
CeCe White - background vocals

References

1999 debut albums
Cree Summer albums
Albums produced by Lenny Kravitz
Work Records albums
Soul albums by Canadian artists
Folk albums by Canadian artists
Soul albums by American artists
Folk albums by American artists